Denis Sergeyevich Spitsov  (born 16 August 1996) is a Russian cross-country skier who competes internationally.

Spitsov debuted in the World Cup in Davos, Switzerland, on 9 December 2017. He participated at the 2018 Winter Olympics, where he won a bronze medal in 15 km interval race, two silver medals in team sprint (with Alexander Bolshunov) and men's relay. Spitsov also finished fourth in 30 km skiathlon.

Cross-country skiing results
All results are sourced from the International Ski Federation (FIS).

Olympic Games
 5 medals – (1 gold, 3 silver, 1 bronze)

Distance reduced to 30 km due to weather conditions.

World Championships

World Cup

Season standings

Individual podiums
1 victory – (1 )
6 podiums – (1 , 5 )

Team podiums
 1 victory – (1 ) 
 4 podiums – (4 )

Personal life
On 10 February 2022, Spitsov, who was previously senior lieutenant, received the rank of captain by the National Guard of Russia.

Notes

References

1996 births
Living people
People from Vozhegodsky District
Russian male cross-country skiers
Cross-country skiers at the 2018 Winter Olympics
Cross-country skiers at the 2022 Winter Olympics
Olympic cross-country skiers of Russia
Medalists at the 2018 Winter Olympics
Medalists at the 2022 Winter Olympics
Olympic gold medalists for the Russian Olympic Committee athletes
Olympic silver medalists for the Russian Olympic Committee athletes
Olympic silver medalists for Olympic Athletes from Russia
Olympic bronze medalists for Olympic Athletes from Russia
Olympic medalists in cross-country skiing
Tour de Ski skiers
Sportspeople from Vologda Oblast